The Hombach (in its lower course: Leester Mühlenbach) is a river in Lower Saxony, Germany. It is a left tributary of the Ochtum.

See also
List of rivers of Lower Saxony

References

Rivers of Lower Saxony
Rivers of Germany